"Good Times Bad Times" is a song by the English rock band Led Zeppelin, featured as the opening track on their 1969 debut album Led Zeppelin.  The song was Led Zeppelin's first single released in the US, where it reached the Billboard Hot 100 chart.

Recording
For the lead guitar solo, guitarist Jimmy Page fed the output from his Fender Telecaster guitar through a Leslie speaker to create a swirling effect. John Paul Jones says that the riff he wrote for this song was the most difficult one he ever wrote.

Live performances

"Good Times Bad Times" was rarely played live at Led Zeppelin concerts in its entirety. In a few instances in 1969 it was used as an introduction to "Communication Breakdown" (as seen in Led Zeppelin (Deluxe Edition)). It also appeared in almost complete form within the "Communication Breakdown" medley performed at the LA Forum on 4 September 1970, where it included a bass solo by Jones (as can be heard on the Led Zeppelin bootleg recording Live on Blueberry Hill), and several "Whole Lotta Love" medleys in 1971. It was also the opening song for Led Zeppelin's reunion show at the O2 Arena, London on 10 December 2007. The version of "Good Times Bad Times/Communication Breakdown" released 15 April 2014, on iTunes, is from 10 October 1969 in Paris, on the European Tour of Autumn 1969.

Reception and charts
In a reassessment of Led Zeppelin in 2016, Andy Greene of Rolling Stone praised "Good Times Bad Times", writing that the song begins the album with a bang: "Jimmy Page's guitar pounces from the speakers, fat with menace; John Bonham's kick drum swings with anvil force; Robert Plant rambles on about the perils of manhood. Hard rock would never be the same."

Godsmack version

The American rock band Godsmack covered the song in 2007, for their album, Good Times, Bad Times... Ten Years of Godsmack. Their version reached number eight on the US Billboard Mainstream Rock Tracks and number 28 on its Modern Rock Tracks charts in 2007.

Citations

Sources

External links

1969 songs
1969 debut singles
Atlantic Records singles
Led Zeppelin songs
Republic Records singles
Songs written by Jimmy Page
Songs written by John Bonham
Songs written by John Paul Jones (musician)
Songs written by Robert Plant
Song recordings produced by Jimmy Page
Universal Records singles